Zhao'an is a county in the municipal region of Zhangzhou, southernmost Fujian province, People's Republic of China.

History

Qing dynasty to the Republic of China 

In May 1907, county officials arrested, on suspicion of piracy, the local leaders of a movement called the "White Fan". They escaped, rallied their followers, captured the top mandarin, and killed the sheriff. 30,000 strong, they menaced Chaozhou. The anti-dynastic rebels had been gaining in popular support in the Minnan-speaking south of Fujian since 1906; local government soldiers would not fight them.

Qing troops were dispatched from Fuzhou and Guangzhou, capitals of the two affected provinces. Engaging the rebels at the end of the month, they killed 600. Some of the citizens of Zhangzhou fu felt themselves to be in danger, and came down to Xiamen, where the United States Navy gunboat Helena floated in Xiamen Bay.

Population
The population in Zhao'an are Minnan and Hakka.

Administration

Towns (镇, zhen)
 Sidu
 Meiling
 Qiaodong
 Nanzhao
 Taiping
 Xiage
 Guanbei
 Xiuzhuan
 Shenqiao

Townships (乡, xiang)

 Meizhou
 Jinxing
 Xitan
 Baiyang
 Jianshe
 Hongxing

Climate

Notes and references

 
County-level divisions of Fujian
Zhangzhou